Bruce McMillan  (May 10, 1947- ) is a contemporary American author of children books, photo-illustrator and watercolor artist living in Shapleigh, Maine. Born in Massachusetts, he grew up in Bangor, and Kennebunk, Maine. He received a degree in biology from the University of Maine.  In addition to his 45 children's books, seven of them set in Iceland, he has authored two books of humor, Punography, featured in Life magazine, and Punography Too. His interest in biology is often reflected in his books' topics. He has published three genres of children's picture books - concept books, nonfiction, and fiction. In 2006, he was honored by the Maine Library Association with the Katahdin Award honoring his outstanding body of work of children's literature in Maine.

McMillan's watercolor art has been in numerous juried shows in New England and Iceland. His 2018 Winter Olympics curling watercolors were a two-page feature in the Maine Sunday Telegram Arts Section. His watercolor Browns Head Light Vinalhaven was Best in Show at the Port Clyde (Maine) Art Gallery Third Annual Invitational 10 x 10 Show in 2017. His watercolors are in private collections in the US, Canada, Iceland, and Switzerland.

McMillan's most noted award-winning children's book is Nights of the Pufflings (1995), set on the Icelandic island of Heimaey. The story introduces a local children's tradition of rescuing young birds, pufflings (a name he coined), which take their first flight on August nights, some stranded in the village streets. The children then set them free at the beach at daytime. His books were the first photo-illustrated children's books ever featured on the covers of The Bulletin for the Center of Children's Books (Nights of the Pufflings), The Horn Book Guide (Nights of the Pufflings), and Booklinks magazine (Mary Had a Little Lamb).

McMillan was honored with a permanent corner in the Springvale (Maine) Public Library's Children's Room, The Bruce McMillan Corner, where nine of his original photo-illustrations from Grandfather's Trolley are on permanent display.

McMillan has taught writing, illustrating, and publishing children's picture books for the Professional Development division open to the public at the University of Southern Maine and the University of New Hampshire (where he taught for 40 years), with students successfully published by major US publishers. He has spoken at hundreds of schools and conferences in the US.

Several of McMillan's children's books were translated into other languages - Icelandic, German and Korean. Hand-colored original photo-illustrations from Grandfather's Trolley are in the public collections of the Mazza Collection, University of Findlay, Findlay, Ohio, Keene State College original children's art collection, Keene, New Hampshire, the Kennebunk Free Library, Kennebunk, Maine (his teen-years library), and the Springvale (Maine) Public Library (his adult-years library).

"My publishing success with books, creating those playful learning tools for children, as a writer, as a photographer, as a teacher, has its roots in the patient, almost invisible, nurturing from boy to adult of my wise father, Frank Harold McMillan, Jr." -Bruce McMillan, November 7, 2021

Bruce McMillan was twice married, Valeria Therese "Terry" Loughran McMillan, 1968-1985, and Lori Beth Evans, 1997-2001. He has one son, Brett Brownrigg McMillan (1969- ) and two grandsons, Finn (2002- ) and Teague (2004- ).

Children's books 

 How the Ladies Stopped the Wind, Houghton Mifflin, 2007 (illustrated by Gunnella)
 The Problem with Chickens, Houghton Mifflin, Salka, 2005 (illustrated by Gunnella)
 Going Fishing, Houghton Mifflin, Salka, 2005
 Days of the Ducklings, Houghton Mifflin, 2001
 Gletta the Foal,	Cavendish, 1998
 Salmon Summer, Houghton Mifflin, 1998
 Wild Flamingos, Houghton Mifflin, 1997
 My Horse of the North, Scholastic, 1997
 The Picture that Mom Drew, Walker, 1997 - by Mallat and McMillan	
 Jelly Beans for Sale, Scholastic,	1996
 Grandfather's Trolley, Candlewick, 1995
 Summer Ice: Life along the Antarctic Peninsula, Houghton Mifflin,	1995	
 Puffins Climb, Penguins Rhyme, Harcourt, 1995
 Nights of the Pufflings, Houghton Mifflin, 1995
 Sense Suspense: A Guessing Game for the Five Senses, Scholastic, 1994
 Penguins at Home: Gentoos of Antarctica,	Houghton Mifflin, 1993
 A Beach for the Birds.	Houghton Mifflin, 1993
 Mouse Views: What the Class Pet Saw	, Holiday House,	1993
 Going on a Whale Watch, Scholastic, 1992
 Beach Ball - Left Right, Holiday House, 1992 and Apple Island Books, 1998
 The Baby Zoo, Scholastic,	1992 and Apple Island Books,	1998
 Eating Fractions, Scholastic,	1991
 Play Day:	A Book of Terse Verse,	Holiday House,	1991 and Apple Island Books,	1998
 The Weather Sky,	Farrar, Straus, Giroux,	1991
 One Two One Pair!,	Scholastic,	1991 and Apple Island Books	
 Mary Had a Little Lamb, Scholastic, 1990 and Apple Island Books,	1998
 One Sun: A Book of Terse Verse, Holiday House,	1990 and Apple Island Books,	1998
 Time To...,	Scholastic,	1989
 Everything Grows,	Crown,	1989
 Super, Super, Superwords,	Lothrop, Lee & Shepard,	1989
 Fire Engine Shapes,	Lothrop, Lee & Shepard,	1988
 Growing Colors,	Lothrop, Lee & Shepard,	1988 and Apple Island Books	
 Dry or Wet?,	Lothrop, Lee & Shepard,	1988
 Step by Step,	Lothrop, Lee & Shepard,	1987 and Apple Island Books,	1995
 Becca Backward, Becca Frontward: A Book of Concept Pairs,	Lothrop, Lee & Shepard,	1986
 Counting Wildflowers,	Lothrop, Lee & Shepard,	1986
 Kitten Can...,	Lothrop, Lee & Shepard,	1984
 Here a Chick, There a Chick, Lothrop, Lee & Shepard,	1983
 Ghost Doll,	Houghton Mifflin,	1983 and Apple Island Books,	1997
 Puniddles,	Houghton Mifflin,	1982
 Making Sneakers,	Houghton Mifflin,	1980
 Apples: How They Grow,	Houghton Mifflin,	1979 and Apple Island Books	
 The Remarkable Riderless Runaway Tricycle,	Houghton Mifflin,	1978 and Apple Island Books, 1978
 The Alphabet Symphony,	Greenwillow,	1977 and Apple Island Books,	1978
 Finestkind o' Day: Lobstering in Maine, Lippincott,	1977 and DownEast,	1978

Humor books 

Punography Too,	Penguin Books,	1980 
Punography,	Penguin Books,	1978

Icelandic books (published in Iceland)

Puffins from the Other Side of Iceland, Salka,	2006
Postcards from the Other Side of Iceland: Where the Grass is Greener, Salka,	2006

Children's book awards

References

External links 
 Bruce McMillan's books web page
Bruce McMillan's watercolor blog

Writers from Bangor, Maine
Living people
1947 births